Ayumi Fukushima (born June 22, 1983), also known as Ayumi, is a Japanese breakdancer. She participated at the 2022 World Games in the dancesport competition, being awarded the bronze medal in the B-Girls event. In 2021, Fukushima won the world championship in a competition in France. She also participated at a Red Bull BC One competition.

References 

1983 births
Living people
Place of birth missing (living people)
Japanese female dancers
Breakdancers
World Games bronze medalists
Competitors at the 2022 World Games
20th-century Japanese women
21st-century Japanese women